Supervivientes 2022: Perdidos en Honduras is the seventeenth season of the show Supervivientes and the twenty-first season of Survivor to air in Spain and it was broadcast on Telecinco from 21 April 2022 to 28 July 2022 and won by Alejandro Nieto (Mister Spain 2015). This season repeated the same host panel from the previous season: Jorge Javier Vázquez was the main host at the central studio in Madrid, with Lara Álvarez co-hosting from the island and Carlos Sobera hosting a gala in Cuatro, but Ion Aramendi replaced Jordi Gonzalez hosting a side debate of the program.

Cast
The contestants were announced daily by the network.

Weekly statistics 

Note (*): Desirée is retaken due to Juan's abandonment and then is re-eliminated.

Nomination

Tribes

References

Survivor Spain seasons